Dvorska Luda predstavlja: Ples sa vragom is a compilation released in 2009.

The compilation features two EPs: 'Konflikt" by Joe Shua Kizz and "Zbog vlasti" by Dvorska Luda and Psiho Mistik.

Track listing

Konflikt EP 
 "Konflikt" - 3:40
 "Korumpirani, a?" - 2:59
 Guest musician: 2JNK
 First verse: Joe Shua Kizz
 Second verse: 2JNK
 "Molotov koktel" - 4:59
Guest musicians: Dvorska Luda, 2JNK and Darzee    
First verse: Dvorska Luda
Second verse: 2JNK 
Third verse: Darzee
Fourth verse: Joe Shua Kizz

Zbog vlasti EP 
 "Zbog vlasti" - 5:00
First verse: Dvorska Luda
Second verse: Psiho Mistik
Third verse: Dvorska Luda
 "Odjek revolucije" - 3:59
First verse: Psiho Mistik
Second verse: Dvorska Luda

Bonus Tracks 
 "Heavy jazzerica" - 3:46
First verse: Dvorska Luda
Second verse: Joe Shua Kizz
Third verse: Labia
Fourth verse: Psiho Mistik
 "9. krug pakla" - 5:05
First verse: Dvorska Luda
Second verse: Labia
Third verse: Psiho Mistik
Chorus: Dvorska Luda
Fourth verse: 2JNK
Fifth verse: Darzee
Sixth verse: Joe Shua Kizz
Chorus: Dvorska Luda

2009 compilation albums
Dvorska Luda albums
Barska Stoka albums